Calosoma breviusculus is a species of ground beetle in the subfamily of Carabinae. It was described by Mannerheim in 1830.

References

breviusculus
Beetles described in 1830